was an mid-Edo period Japanese samurai, and the 6th daimyō of Sendai Domain in the Tōhoku region of northern Japan, and the 22nd hereditary chieftain of the Date clan.

Biography
Munemura was the fourth son of Date Yoshimura. Two of his older brothers died young, and the third (Date Murakaze) formed a separate hatamoto household, so he was appointed heir. He was also betrothed to the daughter of Tokugawa Munenao, the daimyō of Kii Domain at that time. He became daimyō in 1743 upon the retirement of his father. He was noted as a man of many talents. As was his father, he was noted for his literary achievements, and he was also proficient in horsemanship, swordsmanship, use of the spear, military strategy and hōjutsu (gunnery).

In 1747, Hosokawa Munetaka, daimyō of Kumamoto Domain was cut down by a hatamoto, Itakura Katsukane, while en route to a ceremony at Edo Castle. Katsukane had a vendetta against Itakura Katsukiyo of Annaka Domain, but as the Hosokawa and Itakura family crests are so similar, he killed the wrong man. This placed the Hosokawa clan in danger of attainder, as Munetake was without heir. Date Munemura, who happened to be nearby when the incident occurred, knelt by the corpse of Hosotake Munetake and loudly declared "he still lives!" and ordered his retainers to take the body to the Hosokawa clan residence before the Shogun's metsuke inspectors could arrive at the scene. This allowed the Hosokawa clan to make a formal announcement that Munetaka had formally adopted his younger brother as heir, and the report on the death of Munetaka was delayed until the following day.

In 1752, Sendai Domain was struck by a severe famine. While touring a stricken village in what is now Watari District, Miyagi on his way back from sankin-kōtai in Edo, he was directly petitioned by the headman of Nakaizumi village, Kitahara Kanehira, for a reduction in the village's taxes. As was the common punishment for such an action, the headman's house and fields were confiscated and he was crucified as punishment,

Munemura died in 1756, and was succeeded by his son, Date Shigemura. His grave is at the Date clan mausoleum at Dainenjiyama in Sendai.

Family
 Father: Date Yoshimura
 Mother: Fuyuhime (1689–1745)
 Wife: Unsho-in (Tonehime) (1717–1746), daughter of Tokugawa Munenao and adopted daughter of Tokugawa Yoshimune
 1st daughter: Motohime (1739–1761) married Nabeshima Shigemochi, daimyo of Nabeshima Domain
 3rd daughter: unnamed, died in infancy
 Concubine: Nobuko (Osei no Kata) (1719–1763)
 1st son: Kumenosuke, died in childhood
 2nd son: Date Shigemura, daimyō of Sendai Domain
 2nd daughter: Ichihime, died in childhood
 4th daughter: Kaihime married Sakai Tadatsura of Obama Domain
 5th daughter: Genhime, married Nakamura Kagesada
 6th daughter: Naohime, died in childhood
 7th daughter: Yorihime, died in childhood
 7th son: Date Fujishiro, died in childhood
 8th son: Hotta Masaatsu (1755–1832), daimyo of Katata Domain
 Concubine:  Oriku no Kata
 Doi Toshinari (1748–1813), daimyō of Kariya Domain
 Concubine:  Otoyo no Kata
 Date Muratomo (1749–1776), hatamoto head of the Wakuya-Date cadet clan
 Concubine: Odai no Kata
 5th son, Date Yukichiyo, died in childhood
 Concubine: Ono no Kata
 Concubine: Okiyo no Kata
 6th son: Doi Toshiyasu (1750–1766)
 9th daughter: Seihime married Matsudaira Harusato, daimyō of Matsue Domain
 Concubine: Hotoe no Kata (Yuzen-in)
 8th daughter: Eihime, died in childhood
 11th daughter: Hisahime, died in childhood
 12th daughter: Ryuhime, died in childhood
 Concubine: Ishiawa-dono
 10th daughter: Saihime, died in childhood

References
Papinot, Edmond. (1948). Historical and Geographical Dictionary of Japan. New York: Overbeck Co.

External links
Sendai Domain on "Edo 300 HTML" (3 November 2007) 

1718 births
1756 deaths
Tozama daimyo
Date clan
People of Edo-period Japan